Mount Abraham may refer to:

 Mount Abraham (Maine)
 Mount Abraham (Vermont)

See also
 Abraham Mountain, Alberta, Canada
 Abraham Peak in the Court of the Patriarchs, Utah